Reno Township may refer to:

 Reno Township, Leavenworth County, Kansas, in Leavenworth County, Kansas
 Reno Township, Reno County, Kansas, in Reno County, Kansas
 Reno Township, Michigan
 Reno Township, Pope County, Minnesota

Township name disambiguation pages